Walda Giyorgis (died June 1918) was an ecclesiastic during the reign of Menelik II.

Biography

Early years
Walda Giyorgis was a monk of Amhara lineage, who in his early years, served at the monastery of Mahbere Selassie, near the border town of Metemma in Begemder province.

Gojjam period
He was summoned to the court of Negus Tekle Haymanot, where he gradually accumulated influence, and became the chief confessor (Alaqa) of the Negus. Walda Giyorgis accompanied his Negus to Embabo, when on 6 June 1882, he witnessed (some sources say he inspired soldiers and took part in) the Battle of Embabo. The Shewan forces won out against the Gojjames, and took Tekle Haymanot prisoner. Thereafter, at Menelik's invitation, he went to the victor's court in Shewa.

Under Menelik II
He taught church education at Entoto Raguel Church in the northern outskirts of Addis Ababa. His star pupil, Heruy Wolde Selassie became one of Ethiopia's most iconic litterateur.

Over the years, Walda Giyorgis gained Menelik's trust, and in 1896, following the victory over the Italian invaders at the Battle of Adwa, he was elevated as the Nebura-ed of Aksum. Walda Giyorgis was thus invested with significant control over Tigray Province; his contemporaries called him ‘‘Menelik II's agent in Tigray.

Notes

References

19th-century Ethiopian people
20th-century Ethiopian people
History of Ethiopia
1918 deaths